Elections were held in Central Visayas for seats in the House of Representatives of the Philippines on May 13, 2013.

Summary

Bohol
Each of Bohol's three legislative districts elected representative to the House of Representatives. The candidates with the highest number of votes won the seats.

1st District
Rene Relampagos was the incumbent. The last termer and incumbent Tagbilaran city mayor Dan Neri Lim challenged him for the congressional seat.

2nd District
Incumbent Erico Aumentado died while in office on December 25, 2012. The Nationalist People's Coalition named his son Aris as their substitute. The younger Aumentado tangled with his father's perennial rival, former three-term congressman and the incumbent Trinidad mayor Roberto Cajes.

3rd District
Incumbent Arthur Yap ran unopposed for the second consecutive election after his opponent, Loboc mayor, Leon Calipusan, backed out for personal reasons.

Cebu
Each of Cebu's six and 3 others legislative districts elected representative to the House of Representatives. The candidates with the highest number of votes won the seats.

1st District
Incumbent Eduardo Gullas was term limited; he ran for mayor of Talisay City. His party nominated his son, Gerard Anthony.

2nd District
Pablo P. Garcia was the incumbent.

3rd District
Incumbent Pablo John Garcia ran for governor instead. His sister, incumbent Governor Gwen Garcia was party's nominee.

4th District
Benhur Salimbangon was the incumbent.

5th District
Incumbent Ramon Durano ran for the Danao city vice mayoralty instead; his brother, former tourism secretary Joseph Ace Durano ran under the Liberal Party banner.

6th District
Gabriel Luis Quisimbing was the incumbent, his opponent was former congresswoman Nerissa Corazon Soon-Ruiz running under the United Nationalist Alliance banner.

Cebu City

1st District
Incumbent Rachel del Mar did not run; her party named Raul del Mar as their nominee. Her primary opponent was actress Annabelle Rama. Rama announced her candidacy for Congress via Twitter in May 2012, debunking rumors that she was running for the city council. Cebu City mayor Michael Rama, her cousin, confirmed Rama's candidacy. The PDP–Laban, one of the parties within the United Nationalist Alliance, adopted Mayor Rama's ticket as their candidates in the elections, including Annabelle Rama.

The Commission on Elections disqualified Junan Arenasa, Pablo Dorinio and Eliseo Tumulak for being "nuisance candidates".

2nd District
Incumbent Tomas Osmeña ran for mayor against incumbent Cebu City mayor Mike Rama. His party nominated Rodrigo Abellanosa for the South District congressional post.

Lapu-Lapu City

Incumbent Arturo Radaza did not run; his daughter Aileen Radaza was the party's nominee.

Negros Oriental
Each of Negros Oriental's three legislative districts elected representatives to the House of Representatives. The candidates with the highest number of votes won the seats.

1st District
Incumbent Jocelyn Sy-Limkaichong was on her second term but she decided to run for governor instead. The ruling Liberal Party nominated her brother-in-law, former Land Transportation Franchising and Regulatory Board board member Manuel Iway, as its nominee.

2nd District
George P. Arnaiz was the incumbent. His primary opponent was Bais mayor Karen Villanueva.

3rd District
Pryde Henry Teves was the incumbent.

Siquijor
Orlando B. Fua Sr. was the incumbent on his second term but decided not to run. Instead his party named his son Governor Orlando Fua Jr. as their nominee.

Winning candidate Jose Ray Pernes died May 12, one day before election, because of a heart attack. He was substituted by his wife Marie Anne Pernes.

References

External links
COMELEC - Official website of the Philippine Commission on Elections (COMELEC)
NAMFREL - Official website of National Movement for Free Elections (NAMFREL)
PPCRV - Official website of the Parish Pastoral Council for Responsible Voting (PPCRV)

2013 Philippine general election
Lower house elections in Central Visayas